The 2020 Leinster Senior Hurling Championship is the 2020 installment of the annual Leinster Senior Hurling Championship organised by Leinster GAA. Wexford were the defending champions. Originally scheduled to be a round robin competition, due to the suspension caused by the impact of the COVID-19 pandemic on Gaelic games, the provincial competition was switched to a knockout format. The Rob Robin format to be rescheduled for 2022 season.

Teams

The Leinster championship was contested by four counties from the Irish province of Leinster, as well as one county from the Irish province of Connacht, where the sport is only capable of supporting one county team at this level.

Personnel and general information

Bracket

Final

See also
 2020 All-Ireland Senior Hurling Championship
 2020 Munster Senior Hurling Championship
 2020 Joe McDonagh Cup

References

Leinster
Leinster Championship
Leinster Senior Hurling Championship